47P/Ashbrook–Jackson is a periodic comet in the Solar System.

The comet nucleus is estimated to be 5.6 kilometers in diameter.

History 
Comet 47P/Ashbrook–Jackson was discovered by Joseph Ashbrook and Cyril Jackson in 1948.

Name 
47p is in the name because it was the 47th periodic comet discovered. Ashbrook–Jackson is the names of its two discoverers.

Apparitions 
 October 28, 2025
 June 10, 2017
 January 31, 2009
 January 6, 2001
 July 14, 1993
 January 24, 1986
 August 19, 1978
 March 13, 1971
 October 2, 1963
 April 6, 1956
 October 4, 1948

References

External links 
 47P/Ashbrook-Jackson – Seiichi Yoshida @ aerith.net
 47P at Kronk's Cometography / Periodic comets
 

Periodic comets
0047
Comets in 2017
19480826